Zollbrück railway station is a railway station in the municipality of Rüderswil, in the Swiss canton of Bern. It is an intermediate stop on the standard gauge Solothurn–Langnau line of BLS AG.

Services 
The following services stop at Zollbrück:

References

External links 
 
 

Railway stations in the canton of Bern
BLS railway stations